This is a list of chartered cities in the Philippines. Philippine cities are classified into three groups: highly urbanized cities, independent component cities, and component cities.

Classes
Highly urbanized cities are local government units autonomous from provinces that have a minimum population of 200,000 and an annual income of at least  50 million (in 1991 constant prices). Independent Component Cities are cities outside of provincial jurisdiction (although some are allowed to participate in the election of provincial officials) that have not yet attained the 'highly urbanized' status, while Component Cities are those under a province's jurisdiction. In addition, each city is classified into six income brackets according to income in a four-year period. For instance, First-class cities have an income of  400 million or more, while Sixth-class cities earn less than  80 million in a four-year period.

Each city is governed by both the Local Government Code of 1991 and the city's own municipal charter, under the laws of the Republic of the Philippines.

Map

List
There are 148 cities of the Philippines as of December 17, 2022. Thirty-three of these are highly urbanized cities, five are independent component cities, with the rest being component cities of their respective provinces. City charter documents, if available, could be accessed by clicking on the related external link ( indicates Commonwealth Act,  for Republic Act).

See also
List of cities and municipalities in the Philippines
List of metropolitan areas in the Philippines

References

External links

 Philippine Standard Geographic Code (PSGC)

 
Cities